National Highway 530 (NH 530) is a National Highway in India.

Route 
NH530 connects Rampur to Bareilly via Milak, Mirganj and Fatehganj.

Junctions  

  Terminal near Rampur.
  Terminal near Bareilly.

Image Gallery

References

National highways in India
National Highways in Uttar Pradesh